Veronika Sprügl (born 21 December 1987) is a road cyclist from Austria. She represented her nation at the 2007 UCI Road World Championships.

References

External links
 profile at Procyclingstats.com

1987 births
Austrian female cyclists
Living people
Place of birth missing (living people)